Tanner Sportwaffen AG is a Swiss firearms manufacturer based in Fulenbach, Switzerland. The company was founded in 1955 by André Tanner, and is known for having produced bolt-action rifles for shooters at the top level within CISM and ISSF shooting for a number of years. On 12 September 2019, the successful coach Rolf Denzler took over the company from the previous owner Hildegard Tanner.

Models 
In 2019, Tanner launched the PHÖNIX rifle model which can be delivered configured for either 300 m standard rifle or 300 m rifle three positions.

See also 
 Bleiker
 Grünig + Elmiger AG
 Keppeler

References

External links 
 Offisielt nettsted

Firearm manufacturers of Switzerland
Swiss companies established in 1955
Companies based in the canton of  Solothurn